Peter Malcolm Sumner-Potts (29 January 1942 – 22 November 2016), professionally known as Peter Sumner, was an Australian actor, director, and writer. He had a long career in theatre, television, and film.

Career
His credits include parts in such films as Color Me Dead (1969), Ned Kelly (1970), The Chant of Jimmie Blacksmith (1978), The Survivor (1981) and Bush Christmas (1983), as well as a starring role in television series Spyforce along with his portrayal of Bill Hayden in The Dismissal. In an interview in 1978 for the Sir Joseph Banks High School newspaper, he revealed that he had an uncredited role off stage, controlling the Dianoga (garbage compactor monster) in Star Wars, as well as playing the role of Lieutenant Pol Treidum in that film. Sumner played Arnie in the first series of the British science fiction drama television series Jeopardy in 2002, filmed in Australia.

His other local television acting work included regular roles as Bruce Jefferson in Tickled Pink (1978–81), Phillip Seymour in All the Way (1988), Reverend Green in Cluedo (1992), and Les Bailey in Heartbreak High (1997–99), along with numerous guest roles in series including Homicide, Division 4, Matlock Police, Boney, The Sullivans, Cop Shop, Neighbours, E Street, The Flying Doctors, and Home and Away.

Sumner was a follower of Meher Baba and directed a TV documentary, Baba's Birthday, shot in India, produced by Sensory Image, with music by Pete Townshend. The documentary follows Sumner's son, Luke Sumner, as he journeys to India in search of spiritual meaning.

Sumner was a high-school teacher before he started acting. His wife Lynda Stoner and he remained married until his death.

Sumner also served a stint as a presenter on Play School, mainly acting as a stand-in for John Hamblin.

He died aged 74, after a long illness on 22 November 2016.

Filmography
They're a Weird Mob (1966) - Bit Part (uncredited)
Color Me Dead (1969) - Stanley Phillips
Ned Kelly (1970) - Tom Lloyd
The Lost Islands (1976 TV series) - Christian Dobler
Star Wars (1977) - Lt. Pol Treidum (uncredited)
The Chant of Jimmie Blacksmith (1978) - Dowie Steed
The King of the Two Day Wonder (1978)
Middle Age Spread (1979) - Reg
Run Rebecca, Run (1981) - Mr. Dimitros
The Survivor (1981) - Tewson
Bush Christmas (1983) - Ben Thompson
Seeing Red (1992) - Gorman
Moby Dick (1998) - Captain Gardiner
Ektopos (2011) - Zebediah
Ryder Country (2012) - Professor Ed Woodman
The Quarantine Hauntings (2015) - Dr. Henry Dickenson (final film role)

References

External links 
 
 

1942 births
2016 deaths
Australian male film actors
Followers of Meher Baba
Australian children's television presenters